{{DISPLAYTITLE:C16H18N2O}}
The molecular formula C16H18N2O (molar mass: 254.33 g/mol) may refer to:

 Amphenone B, or amphenone
 Elymoclavine
 Epoxyagroclavine
 Lysergol
 Setoclavine

Molecular formulas